Silver Lake Township may refer to:

 Silver Lake Township, Desha County, Arkansas
 Silver Lake Township, Dickinson County, Iowa
 Silver Lake Township, Palo Alto County, Iowa
 Silver Lake Township, Worth County, Iowa
 Silver Lake Township, Shawnee County, Kansas, in Shawnee County, Kansas
 Silver Lake Township, Martin County, Minnesota
 Silver Lake Township, Adams County, Nebraska
 Silver Lake Township, Wells County, North Dakota
 Silver Lake Township, Susquehanna County, Pennsylvania
 Silver Lake Township, Hutchinson County, South Dakota

See also 

Silver Lake (disambiguation)

Township name disambiguation pages